Michael Paul "Mystic Mike" Johnson (born October 3, 1974) is a Canadian former professional ice hockey right winger who played in the NHL for the Toronto Maple Leafs, Tampa Bay Lightning, Phoenix Coyotes, Montreal Canadiens and the St. Louis Blues.

Playing career
As a youth, Johnson played in the 1988 Quebec International Pee-Wee Hockey Tournament with a minor ice hockey team from Wexford, Toronto.

Undrafted, Johnson was signed right out of college by the Toronto Maple Leafs upon the completion of his senior year Bowling Green State University. Johnson made his professional debut for the Leafs within days finishing the 1996–97 season. The following year in the 1997–98 season, Johnson was named in the NHL All-Rookie team after compiling a rookie lead tying 47 points.  Johnson exceeded his rookie points total in two campaigns with the Phoenix Coyotes.

On July 12, 2006, Johnson was traded to the Montreal Canadiens. The following season, on October 4, 2007, he signed a one-year contract with the St. Louis Blues but only played in 21 games before suffering a season-ending shoulder injury.

Unable to sign with another NHL team, Johnson signed with Kölner Haie of the German DEL for the 2008–09 season, joining former teammate Todd Warriner.

Broadcasting career
Johnson is an analyst for the NHL Network and TSN. He previously served as colour commentator for the Winnipeg Jets, a role he assumed since the beginning of the 2011 season. When Rogers Media won the NHL rights, he moved to Sportsnet to work on national games and he was assigned to his first conference final in 2015, the first of two in a row. Johnson's services were terminated by Rogers Media on August 10, 2016. He re-joined TSN in September 2017.

Personal life
Johnson and his wife have two daughters together.

Awards and achievements
1997–98  NHL All-Rookie Team

Career statistics

Regular season and playoffs

International

References

External links

1974 births
Bowling Green Falcons men's ice hockey players
Canadian ice hockey right wingers
Färjestad BK players
Living people
National Hockey League broadcasters
Montreal Canadiens players
Phoenix Coyotes players
St. Louis Blues players
Sportspeople from Scarborough, Toronto
Ice hockey people from Toronto
Tampa Bay Lightning players
Toronto Maple Leafs players
Undrafted National Hockey League players
Winnipeg Jets announcers
Canadian expatriate ice hockey players in Sweden